Mecometopus is a genus of beetles in the family Cerambycidae, containing the following species:

 Mecometopus aesopus (Chevrolat, 1860)
 Mecometopus aurantisignatus Zajciw, 1964
 Mecometopus batesii (White, 1855)
 Mecometopus bicinctus Aurivillius, 1920
 Mecometopus cauaburi Martins & Galileo, 2011
 Mecometopus centurio Chevrolat, 1862
 Mecometopus curtus (Laporte & Gory, 1835)
 Mecometopus giesberti Chemsak & Noguera, 1993
 Mecometopus globicollis (Laporte & Gory, 1835)
 Mecometopus ion (Chevrolat, 1860)
 Mecometopus latithorax Martins & Galileo, 2008
 Mecometopus leprieuri (Laporte & Gory, 1835)
 Mecometopus melanion Bates, 1885
 Mecometopus mundus (Chevrolat, 1860)
 Mecometopus palmatus (Olivier, 1795)
 Mecometopus polygenus Thomson, 1860
 Mecometopus remipes Bates, 1885
 Mecometopus riveti Gounelle, 1910
 Mecometopus sarukhani Chemsak & Noguera, 1993
 Mecometopus triangularis (Laporte & Gory, 1835)
 Mecometopus wallacei (White, 1855)

References

 
Clytini